Malmsjøen is a lake in the municipality of Skaun in Trøndelag county, Norway. The Norwegian County Road 709 runs along the northern shore of the lake.

See also
List of lakes in Norway

References

Lakes of Trøndelag
Skaun